Henderskelfe is a civil parish in North Yorkshire, England. The parish does not contain any villages, though it is named after a previous settlement and castle which occupied the land on which Castle Howard is now built. Historically the area was a township in the ecclesiastical parish of Bulmer, however it has been its own civil parish since 1866.

History 
Originally, the area had been called Hinderskelfe, and the manor lands of Hinderskelfe stretched between Stamford Bridge, what is now Castle Howard and Lastingham. Mentioned in the Domesday Book, the area was home to a village and a church, both now lost, with Castle Howard being built on top of the village, and Henderskelfe/Hinderskelfe Castle. As the church had been destroyed, no clergy were assigned to the area, and it became known as an extra-parochial area. The site of the rectory and the church now lie underneath the South Lake, and the garden respectively on the Castle Howard estate. In 1846, a private bill was passed in the House of Commons and the House of Lords, which effectively swapped the two parcels of land in Henderskelfe, with land in Sheriff Hutton; the Archbishop of York owned the parcel of land beneath the lake, and no longer needed it. The township of Henderskelfe remained in the ecclesiastical parish of Bulmer for marriages births and baptisms after it had been created as a civil parish.

Henderskelfe Castle was built during the reign of Edward III to a quadrangular design, though it was listed as being in ruins by 1359.

Leland states in Collectanea, that in 1070, a Scottish raiding party under King Malcolm, "...came to a place called Hinderskelfe and slew some English nobility." At the time of the Domesday survey, the land belonged to Berengar of Tosny, who died without issue and so it passed to his sister, Adeliza, who married Roger Bigod. Henderskelfe passed to the monarchy in 1306, when Bigod died, and all his honours were transferred to the crown. The manor was owned by the Greystoke family in the 16th and 17th centuries. Henderskelfe Castle and village were rebuilt in 1683, but destroyed by fire in 1693. The building of Castle Howard started , and some of the external walls by the gate were built from stone sourced from the ruined castle. Henderskelfe Castle and village were both located immediately west of Ray Wood, which still exists today. A map of 1694, drawn a year after fire destroyed the castle, shows the layout of the village and castle.

The name of Henderskelfe has been suggested by Smith to be an Old Norse combination of Hildar and skjálf; a female personal name and either shelf or seat. However, Morris suggests the name stems from Hundred-Hill, as the site was the meeting place of the wapentakes of Ryedale and Bulmer. The remains of the village of Hinderskelfe/Henderskelfe were demolished when the current Castle Howard buildings were erected in 1699. A map of 1690 shows 24 houses present, though no document records what happened to the villagers. Beresford suggested that the villagers were given houses in either Coneysthorpe or Welburn. The area was classified as a township until 1866, when it was redesignated as a civil parish.

In 1987, the whole of the parish  became part of the newly created Howardian Hills Area of Outstanding Natural Beauty. The Centenary Way long-distance footpath crosses the eastern side of the parish.

Governance 
Henderskelfe was historically in the wapentake of Bulmer, and part of the Malton Rural District in the North Riding of Yorkshire. It is now in the shire district of Ryedale in North Yorkshire. The parish forms part of the Thirsk and Malton Constituency for national government purposes.

In the 2001 census, the parish details were listed as being "below the Office for National Statistics threshold data" (the population was less than 100), so the details were contained within the adjacent parish of Coneysthorpe.

Notable residents 
Sir Humphrey Lascelles died in Henderskelfe in 1102.
William Dacre, 3rd Baron Dacre, lived at Henderskelf[sic], after having to surrender his other estates. He had "embraced Catholicism", and so during the reign of Queen Elizabeth I, he was persecuted for his beliefs, and briefly imprisioned in the Tower of London.

Notes

References

Sources

External links 

Parish boundary map

Civil parishes in North Yorkshire
Ryedale